The Citroën C6 is an executive car produced by the French car maker Citroën since 2005. The Citroën C6 was inspired by the Citroën C6 Lignage concept car with a fastback saloon like styling.

Inspired by the Citroën C6 Lignage prototype, which was first shown at the Geneva Motor Show in the spring of 1999, but differs from the concept car's styling in minor details (like not having rear suicide doors for easy access). The C6 was intended as a replacement for the XM, and Citroën was intent on launching it before the end of 2000.

History
At the time, it was hoped that the C6 would go into production by the end of 2000, as the replacement for the ageing XM, which was first produced in May 1989.

In July 2007, Car ran a 2.7 litre V6 on its long term fleet and rated it for its "waftability" and comfortable interior but felt it was a car that the driver needed time to adjust to. In isolation, the car’s acceleration was regarded as "effortless" but not up to the standards set by similarly priced and equipped vehicles, such as the BMW 535d.

Design

The Citroën C6 Lignage formed the basis of the Citroën C6, which was launched in November 2005, five years later than Citroën had originally planned. The XM ceased production in June 2000, and the first C6 rolled off the production line almost six years later.

Features

The C6 is powered by either a 3.0 L ES9 V6 producing  or a 2.7 L V6 HDi diesel producing .

In October 2006 a 2.2 L HDi producing  with FAP, four cylinders and a dual turbo was introduced. Land Rover used the DW12 engine in the Freelander 2 and Range Rover Evoque, where it generates .

In June 2009, the new 3.0 L V6 HDi diesel producing  replaced the 2.7 L V6 HDi.

The C6 has a fastback saloon profile which is due in part to the concave rear window, similar to the Citroën CX and some models of Dodge in the 60s. However, the C6 is a conventional saloon with a classic trunk, and not a hatchback like its XM predecessor.

The C6 was aimed as a stylish alternative to executive cars, like the BMW 5 Series and the Audi A6, and it has been described as  "spaceship that rides on air", "charmingly idiosyncratic" and "refreshingly different".

Citroën hoped that the C6's selling points would be its innovative technology, which includes a head-up display, a lane departure warning system, xenon directional headlamps (also available on the Citroën C4 and Citroën C5), Hydractive 3+ suspension with electronically controlled springing and damping, and a rear spoiler which automatically adjusts to speed and braking.

The C6 was the first car to obtain four stars in the pedestrian test rating of EuroNCAP, due to the inventive design, where the bonnet pops up by 65 mm using a pyrotechnic mechanism if a person/animal is hit, thus increasing the gap between the deformable bonnet, and the non deformable engine components below.

On an episode of Top Gear, Jeremy Clarkson tested the C6's Hydractive suspension by mounting a camera on it and driving it on the infield of Towcester Racecourse while filming a horse race.

At the same time, a BMW 5 Series (with M Sport package) performed the same test, but its suspension could not keep the camera upright.

The C6 immediately became a prominent vehicle among the fleet of executive cars of the Élysée Palace. Former Presidents of France, Jacques Chirac and Nicolas Sarkozy, have chosen the Citroën C6 as their official car. Chirac, in particular, used a pre series car before the model was introduced.

Worldwide production and sales figures
At launch, sales expectations across the model's lifespan were given as 20,000 per year. In July 2008, the C6 car configurator on Citroën UK's website no longer offered black as a colour choice for the popular Exclusive trim levels.

By October 2008, the manual transmission and the intermediate Lignage specification were no longer offered. Polar white was added to the colour options (replacing Deep Red). The standard navigation system, named until then "NaviDrive", was renamed "Concert Pack". The 3.0 V6 petrol engine was discontinued in February 2009 – only the 2.2 and 2.7 HDi options with six speed automatic gearboxes were offered, in base C6 or C6 Exclusive trim. In June 2009, the 2.7 HDi engine was replaced by the new 3.0 V6 HDi.

As of 2010, only the 3.0 HDi (240) Exclusive trim was offered in some markets, such as the United Kingdom. Options were limited to Sunroof, Lounge Pack (TGV rear seats) and "WiFi on Board", a 3G connectivity solution for the car that is little more than a MiFi box and is unrelated to the onboard telephony of the car.

In May 2012 Citroën ceased production of the C6 in right-hand drive. Rumours suggested the C6 was to be replaced by the Citroën DS9, based on the Citroën Numero 9 concept car, which would eventually go into production in 2020. The replacement of the Citroën C6 is the DS 9. Citroën ceased production of the C6 in December 2012, after 23,384 units had been built.

Citroën C6 (China) (2016–present) 

A new car named C6 is sold in China since 2016, and is based on the PSA EMP2 platform. Prices in China starts from ¥189,900 yuan to ¥279,900 yuan. Citroën reused the C6 name. It is based on the platform of the 1st generation Peugeot 508.

Total production

References

External links

EuroNCAP test results
The Lignage C6 concept car shown in action
 C6owners the largest English language online dedicated support site

C6
Executive cars
Sedans
Euro NCAP executive cars
Flagship vehicles
Front-wheel-drive vehicles
2010s cars
Cars introduced in 2005